Dwight Evans may refer to:

 Dwight Evans (baseball) (born 1951), American former baseball player
 Dwight Evans (politician) (born 1954), American politician